Shauna MacDonald is a Canadian television and film actress, director, producer, writer, voice actor, and radio announcer. She became known for her role as the national continuity announcer for CBC Radio One.

Life and career
MacDonald was born in Antigonish, Nova Scotia. She graduated from Dr. John Hugh Gillis Regional High School in Antigonish and later attended Montreal's McGill University, earning a degree in Russian and Slavic Studies.

She became known as the national continuity announcer for CBC Radio One, a role she held from the start of Radio One's 2004 summer season. With MacDonald's identity kept secret, the voice was quickly dubbed Promo Girl. MacDonald's identity was exposed by The Globe and Mail in 2005. The promo spots were taken over in May 2007 by Steve Fletcher.

In the summer of 2005, Radio One ran a series of weekly "comedy-mysteries" starring MacDonald, along with other Radio One personalities, titled Promo Girl in The Mystery of.... Short segments designed to highlight various CBC Radio programmes and the upcoming fall season were repeated a number of times each day, with prizes going to listeners who correctly solved the various clues or mysteries. The series was not completed due to a lockout of CBC employees that began in the late summer.

MacDonald has appeared in various Canadian series, including Trailer Park Boys (as Officer Erica Miller), These Arms of Mine (as Claire Monroe), and This Hour Has 22 Minutes (as a substitute newsreader), among other roles. In 2003 she starred in the two-part miniseries Shattered City: The Halifax Explosion. She has also appeared in an episode of Reign. MacDonald also played Tara in Saw VI, and reprised the role in Saw 3D.

She received a 2009 ACTRA Award nomination for Outstanding Performance – Female for her role as Lily in the short film Loving Loretta (2008).

In 2013, MacDonald and Kate Johnston co-wrote and co-directed the film Tru Love, in which MacDonald also starred. The film won the Best Feature Film Audience Award at the Toronto Inside / Out Film Festival in 2014.

Filmography

Film

Television

Video game

See also 
 List of female film and television directors
 List of LGBT-related films directed by women

References

External links

  Shauna MacDonald at CBC Media Centre (2018)

1970 births
Canadian radio personalities
Living people
Canadian people of Scottish descent
People from Antigonish, Nova Scotia
Radio and television announcers
Actresses from Nova Scotia
Canadian film actresses
Canadian television actresses
Canadian voice actresses
Canadian women film directors
Canadian women screenwriters
21st-century Canadian women writers
21st-century Canadian screenwriters